Álvaro Iglesias Quintana (born 12 July 1972) is a Spanish retired footballer who played as a goalkeeper.

Football career
Born in Barakaldo, Biscay, Iglesias spent the vast majority of his 20-year senior career in the lower leagues, representing several clubs in Segunda División B. His professional input consisted of 83 Segunda División matches during four seasons, representing in the competition CD Tenerife, Gimnàstic de Tarragona and Polideportivo Ejido.

Iglesias was also part of Gimnàstic's La Liga squad in 2006–07, but was not used in the league during the campaign. His only competitive appearance came on 8 November 2006, when he played the entire 1–3 home loss against Real Valladolid for round of 32 of the Copa del Rey.

References

External links

1972 births
Living people
Spanish footballers
Footballers from Barakaldo
Association football goalkeepers
Segunda División players
Segunda División B players
Tercera División players
Arenas Club de Getxo footballers
Sestao Sport Club footballers
Barakaldo CF footballers
Córdoba CF players
Racing de Ferrol footballers
UE Figueres footballers
SD Ponferradina players
CD Tenerife players
Gimnàstic de Tarragona footballers
Polideportivo Ejido footballers
Sestao River footballers